Costas Droutsas (born on 5 December 1939 in Thessaloniki) is a Greek politician, a member of the Greek Communist Party. He was a member of the European Parliament from 3 June 2008 to 13 July 2009, representing Greece in the seat previously held by Diamanto Manolakou.

References

External links
 

1939 births
Living people
Politicians from Thessaloniki
Communist Party of Greece MEPs
European United Left–Nordic Green Left MEPs
MEPs for Greece 2004–2009